The Prefecture Apostolic of Vichada was a Roman Catholic Apostolic Prefecture (missionary pre-diocesan jurisdiction) located in the Vichada Department of Colombia. It was exempt, i.e. directly subject to the Holy See, not part of any ecclesiastical province.

History 
 April 7, 1956: Established as Apostolic Prefecture of Vichada, on territory split off from the Apostolic Vicariate of Villavicencio.
 December 22, 1999: Suppressed to Apostolic Vicariate of Inírida and to establish two other new Apostolic vicariates: Apostolic Vicariate of Puerto Carreño and Apostolic Vicariate of Puerto Gaitán.

Ordinaries 
all incumbents were missionary members of the Latin (Roman rite) congregation of the Missionaries of the Company of Mary (S.M.M.)
 Apostolic Prefects of Ucayali  
 Fr. Emiliano Pied, S.M.M. (July 31, 1956 – 1962)
 Fr. Alfonso Cuypers, S.M.M. (January 22, 1963 – 1969)
 Fr. Lucreciano Onofre Gonsález, S.M.M. (March 28, 1969 – 1974) 
 Fr. José Aurelio Rozo Gutiérrez, S.M.M. (May 6, 1977 – December 22, 1999)

See also
Roman Catholicism in Colombia

References

External links 
 GCatholic.org, with incumbent biography links

Roman Catholic dioceses in Colombia
Apostolic prefectures
Christian organizations established in 1956
Roman Catholic dioceses and prelatures established in the 20th century
Former Roman Catholic dioceses in America